Pyridoxal kinase is an enzyme that in humans is encoded by the PDXK gene.

The protein encoded by this gene phosphorylates vitamin B6, a step required for the conversion of vitamin B6 to pyridoxal-5-phosphate, an important cofactor in intermediary metabolism. The encoded protein is cytoplasmic and probably acts as a homodimer. Alternatively spliced transcript variants have been described, but their biological validity has not been determined.

References

Further reading